Parapentas is a genus of flowering plants belonging to the family Rubiaceae.

Its native range is Tropical Africa.

Species
Species:

Parapentas battiscombei 
Parapentas setigera 
Parapentas silvatica

References

Rubiaceae
Rubiaceae genera